The Irish Guild of Weavers, Spinners, and Dyers (IGWSD) is an organisation for the promotion and preservation of hand weaving, spinning and dyeing in Ireland.

Foundation
The Guild was founded in 1975 by Lillias Mitchell. The Guild has three aims: "To promote and encourage the crafts of Weaving, Spinning & Dyeing. To educate through workshops, lectures and demonstrations. To compile a library and information on materials and equipment." The members include artists, amateurs, and beginners.

Activities
The Guild holds meetings, workshops, exhibitions, and demonstrations nationwide. They also participate in the annual Knitting and Stitching Show in the Royal Dublin Society. The Guild hold events for all levels, including introductory classes.

See also
 Weavers' Hall, Dublin

References

Spinning
Weaving
Textile arts of Ireland
Organizations established in 1975